German submarine U-207 was a Type VIIC U-boat of Nazi Germany's Kriegsmarine during World War II.

Ordered on 16 October 1939 from the Germaniawerft shipyard in Kiel, she was laid down on 14 August 1940 as yard number 636, launched on 24 April 1941 and commissioned on 7 June under the command of Oberleutnant zur See Fritz Meyer.

She sank two ships totalling  in one patrol.

She was sunk by two British warships near Greenland on 11 September 1941.

Design
German Type VIIC submarines were preceded by the shorter Type VIIB submarines. U-207 had a displacement of  when at the surface and  while submerged. She had two shafts and two  propellers.

U-207 was fitted with five  torpedo tubes (four fitted at the bow and one at the stern), fourteen torpedoes, one  SK C/35 naval gun, 220 rounds, and a  C/30 anti-aircraft gun. The boat had a complement of between forty-four and sixty.

Service history
U-207s only patrol began with her departure from Trondheim in Norway on 24 August 1941. She headed west, approaching southern Greenland and attacking the north Atlantic convoy SC 42, sinking Stonepool using torpedoes and five minutes later Berury with gunfire. The convoy escorts reacted swiftly:  and  used depth charges to sink the unfortunate U-boat.

All 41 crewmen died.

Wolfpacks
U-207 took part in one wolfpack, namely:
 Markgraf (27 August - 11 September 1941)

Summary of raiding history

References

Bibliography

External links

German Type VIIC submarines
U0207 (1941)
U-boats commissioned in 1941
U-boats sunk in 1941
U-boats sunk by British warships
1941 ships
World War II shipwrecks in the Atlantic Ocean
Ships built in Kiel
U-boats sunk by depth charges
Ships lost with all hands
Maritime incidents in September 1941